Luke McNitt (born April 20, 1994) is an American football fullback who is currently a free agent. He played college football at Nebraska. McNitt put up 26 reps of 225 pounds on the bench press at Nebraska pro day. He signed with the Atlanta Falcons as an undrafted free agent in 2018.

Professional career

Atlanta Falcons
McNitt signed with the Atlanta Falcons as an undrafted free agent on May 1, 2018. He was waived on August 20, 2018.

Minnesota Vikings
On August 21, 2018, McNitt was claimed off waivers by the Minnesota Vikings. He was waived on August 31, 2018.

References

1994 births
Living people
American football fullbacks
Nebraska Cornhuskers football players
Atlanta Falcons players
Minnesota Vikings players